Lower Class Brats are a street punk band founded in Austin, Texas in January 1995. Based out of Southern California since 2017.

Biography
Formed in 1995 in Austin TX, Lower Class Brats . mix Punk, Oi!, 70s Glam and straight ahead rock and roll.

Line-up

Current Line-up
Bones: vocals/founding member (1995 - present)
Marty Volume: guitar/founding member (1995 - present)
Zed: guitar (2017 - present)
Ron Conflict: Bass (2012 - present)
Nick Brat: Drums (2017 - present)

Former members

Bass 
 Rick Brat: Bass/founding member (1995 -1999, 2000) (Deceased, 2020)
 Houston Richieson: Bass (1999)
 Ryland Meyer: Bass (2000 - 2002)
 Johnny O. Negative: Bass (2008 - 2011)
 EVO: Bass (2002 - 2008, 2011/12)

Drums 
 Rob Brat: Drums/founding member (1995 - 2000)
 Brad Teeter: Drums (2000 - 2002)
 Mike Brat: Drums (2002 - 2004)
 Clay Aloy: Drums (2004 - 2008)
 J.T.K.: Drums (2008 - 2013)
Punt (Eric Powers): (2013 - 2017)

Piano 
 R.T.: Piano (piano on Rather Be Hated Than Ignored, 1997)
 Tony Scalzo: Piano (piano on The New Seditionaries, 2006)

Discography

Demo
Working Class Punk (Self-released cassette tape, 1995) Approx. 200 copies made.

7" Records / EPs
Who Writes Your Rules (Helen Of Oi! Records, 1995) English Import. 1,500 pressed. Black vinyl.
Lower Class Brats / Reducers SF Split (Also known as the Ultra-Violence 7", Pair-O-Docs Records, 1996) 1,000 pressed. 800 black vinyl. 200 white vinyl. With insert.
A Wrench In The Gear (Helen Of Oi! Records, 1996) English Import. 1,500 pressed. Black vinyl.
Lower Class Brats / Dead End Cruisers Split (Second to None Records, 1996) 500 pressed. Blue vinyl.
Lower Class Brats / Templars Split (TKO Records, 1998) 1,500 pressed. 800 black vinyl. 200 orange vinyl. With insert. 500 picture disc.
Psycho (Combat Rock Records, 1999) French Import. 1,500 pressed. Black vinyl. First 100 copies come with a hand #'d insert with lyrics in French.
Glam Bastard (TKO Records, 1999) 2,000 pressed. 1,800 black vinyl. With insert. 200 orange vinyl with a hand #'d full-color fold-out poster.
Deface The Music (Punk Core Records, 2002) 1,000 pressed. 800 black vinyl. 100 purple vinyl. 100 clear vinyl. With insert.
The Worst (Dirty Punk Records, 2004) French Import. 500 pressed. Green / white splatter vinyl. With insert.
I'm A Mess (T.S.O.R. Records, 2006) Swiss Import. 500 pressed. Black vinyl. With insert.
Lower Class Brats / Chelsea Split (TKO Records, 2006) 500 pressed. Green / clear / yellow splatter vinyl. Labels are switched on wrong sides. With insert.
Thoughts About You (Combat Rock Records, 2009) French Import. 500 pressed. Black vinyl.

12" Records / EPs
Punks, Skins, Herberts And Hooligans (Punk Core Records, 1997) 1,000 pressed. Approx. 200 copies were defective and returned to the pressing plant. 200 of the approx. 800 copies left come with a #'d full-color insert. Black vinyl.
Rock 'N' Roll Street Noize (Turkey Baster Records, 2012) 500 pressed. Clear orange vinyl w/ red and black splatter. Includes poster, lyric sheet and download card.

Full Length Albums / CDsRather Be Hated Than Ignored CD (GMM Records, 1997) (Punk Core Records, 2000)  Picture Disc LP (Punk Core Records, 2000) 1,000 pressed. #'d sticker on clear plastic cover. With color insert.
The Plot Sickens CD (Punk Core Records, 2000) LP (Punk Core Records, 2000) 1,000 pressed. 800 black vinyl. 200 grey / green splatter vinyl. With full-color dust sleeve insert.
A Class Of Our Own CD (Punk Core Records, 2003) LP (Punk Core Records, 2003) 1,000 pressed. 800 black vinyl. 100 half white / half orange vinyl. 100 clear / red splatter vinyl. With full-color dust sleeve insert. 
The New Seditionaires CD (TKO Records, 2006) LP (Dirty Punk Records, 2006) French Import. 1,000 pressed. Black vinyl. With insert.

Collections
Primary Reinforcement LP (Combat Rock Records, 1998) French Import. 500 pressed. Contains the first three 7"s. First pressing with black and white cover. Black vinyl. Second pressing with blue and white cover and pink and white FOR EXPORT ONLY sticker on the cover. Black vinyl.
Real Punk Is An Endangered Species: The Clockwork Singles Collection CD (Punk Core Records, 2003) Contains the first eight 7"s and 12" EP.
Primary Reinforcement Plus LP (Orphan Records Group/Loud Punk Records, 2017) 1,000 pressed. Contains the first six 7"s. 800 black vinyl, 100 yellow vinyl and 100 Moloko Splatter vinyl. With insert, sticker and poster.

Live Recordings
Loud And Out Of Tune: Lower Class Brats Live!!! CD (Includes bonus "Live In Seattle" DVD. TKO Records, 2007)

DVDsThis Is Real! (Includes bonus CD of The New Seditionaries''' demos. TKO Records, 2008)''

See also 
 Music of Austin

References

External links
 Lower Class Brats on Myspace
 The Authorized Fansite (archived version, last updated 2005, from GeoCities)

Punk rock groups from Texas
Musical groups from Austin, Texas
Street punk groups
Musical groups established in 1995